The 50th Annual Australian Film Institute Awards for film and television acting achievement in the cinema of Australia in 2008 were presented in a ceremony on 5–6 December 2008. During the ceremony, the Australian Film Institute presented Australian Film Institute Awards (commonly referred to as AFI Awards) in 40 categories including feature films, television, animation and documentaries. It was hosted by Stephen Curry of TV1's The King.

The nominees for Best Documentary, Best Short Fiction Film and Best Short Animation were announced on 7 August whilst all the other nominees were announced at the Nominations Announcement in Sydney on 29 October. The Black Balloon had the most nominations with a total of 11 including Best Film.

Winners of major awards
This is a breakdown of winners of major awards categories only. For a complete list of nominees and winners, see 50th Australian Film Institute Awards nominees and winners.

Film

Feature films

Additional Awards

Television

Series

Directing

Acting

Writing

Multiple nominations

Films
The following films received multiple nominations.
 11 nominations:
The Black Balloon
 10 nominations:
Unfinished Sky
 7 nominations:
The Jammed
The Square

Television
The following television series received multiple nominations.
 8 nominations:
Underbelly
 6 nominations:
East West 101
 3 nominations:
Summer Heights High
The Hollowmen
H2O: Just Add Water
 2 nominations:
The Librarians
Rush

References

Film
A
A
AFI
AFI